Shulgi-simti was the wife or concubine of Shulgi, second king of the Third Dynasty of Ur. She is known from a high number of cuneiform texts coming from her household at Puzrish-Dagan new Nippur. Her name is Akkadian, but the exact meaning is uncertain, evidently the name refers to her husband Shulgi and might be translated as Shulgi is my glory, although this is only a guess.  The name was given to her while she came to Shulgi. Nothing is known about her former life and her family. There is some debate about her position. Many scholars regard her as queen, but other argue that there are only very few texts referring to her as queen and that those are open to different interpretations. Therefore, it seems most likely that she was just a concubine.

Shulgi-simti is mainly known from the archive of her household providing much evidence for people working for her and her economic power. Her secretary, was Maš-gu-la. Several messengers are known. Several men looked after her lifstock Although most of her texts come from Puzrish-Dagan, it seems that she actually lived in Ur.

The cuneiform text archive of Shulgi-simti was found by illegal excavations around 1909. The cuneiform tablets are now mainly in the Oriental Institute of the University of Chicago and in the  Montserrat Abbey in Spain. The texts in the archive mainly deal with transaction in a religious foundation most likely made by Shulgi-simti. The archive stops with her death. The texts can be divided into two groups, incomes and expenditures. The texts provides the names of people working for Shulgi-simti and many further details about economical transactions. However, in comparison to other households, her estate seems to be rather modest.

References

Literature 

21st-century BC people
21st-century BC women
Third Dynasty of Ur